Bahía Blanca Sud (English: Bahía Blanca South) is a railway station of the Argentine rail network, part of the General Roca Railway. Originally built and operated by the Buenos Aires Great Southern Railway, it is located in the city of Bahía Blanca, Buenos Aires Province. In November 2014 the station was declared National Historical Monument by the Argentine government.

Bahía Blanca Sud station is the seat of the Sport Museum ("Museo del Deporte") of the city, although the Municipality announced that it will be moved to "Torre del Bicentenario".

History 

Bahía Blanca Sud was built by the British-owned Buenos Aires Great Southern Railway company and inaugurated on 26 April 1884. The station was named "Bahía Blanca Sud" to differentiate it from the other railway stations in the town, Bahía Blanca Noroeste, built by the British-owned Bahía Blanca and North Western Railway and Bahía Blanca of the Rosario and Puerto Belgrano Railway.

Bahía Blanca was one of the few BAGSR stations that included a coffeehouse (opened with the station in 1884), along with Ayacucho, Azul, Empalme Lobos, Ingeniero White, Las Flores, La Plata, Mar del Plata, Plaza Constitución, Tandil and Tres Arroyos.

In July 1903, the BAGSR announced the construction of a new building, which began in 1909. The remodeling included the enlargement of the installations and the construction of a new main building. The new station was inaugurated on 19 December 1911.

When the entire Argentine railway network was nationalised in 1948, the station became part of General Roca Railway, one of the six divisions of state-owned company Ferrocarriles Argentinos. After the Carlos Menem's administration closed all the long distance services in Argentina, the national Government transferred the operation of several lines in Buenos Aires to the provincial government, including the Roca line from Constitución to Bahía Blanca.

In 2009 the Municipality began works to remodel the station facilities, including its coffeehouse, that were finished one year later. The restoration was executed by the Ministry of Infrastructure of the Province of Buenos Aires and funded by the Ministry of Federal Planning, Public Investment and Services. Between 2011 and 2012 the station clock, dating to 1880, was also restored.

In November 2014, by Decree 2181/2014, the station was declared a National Historical Monument.

From 18 September 2015, Ferrocarriles Argentinos runs a weekly service between Constitución and Bahía Blanca Sud, departring from the capital on Fridays and returning on Sundays.

Gallery

References

External links 

 Arquitectura Ferroportuaria en Bahía Blanca 1880–1930 by José M. Zingoni
 Virtual 360° tour to the station

Railway stations in Buenos Aires Province
Railway stations opened in 1884